Ouchi Station is an underground metro station in Ningbo, Zhejiang, China. It situates on the crossing of Qiyun Road and Liyuan South Road. Construction of the station started in December 2010; the station opened to service on September 26, 2015.

Exits 
Ouchi Station has 2 exits.

References 

Railway stations in Zhejiang
Railway stations in China opened in 2015
Ningbo Rail Transit stations